List of Danish football transfers 2009–10 may refer to:
List of Danish football transfers summer 2009
List of Danish football transfers winter 2009-10
List of Danish football transfers summer 2010